The diocese of Lạng Sơn and Cao Bằng is a Roman Catholic diocese in northern Vietnam's Lạng Sơn and Cao Bằng provinces.

Joseph Chau Ngoc Tri (vn) was appointed in 2016 as the diocese's bishop.

The creation of the diocese in its present form was declared on 24 November 1960. The diocese covers an area of 17,815 km², and is a suffragan diocese of the Archdiocese of Hanoi. By 2004, the diocese had 6,078 believers (0.5% of the population), 4 priests and 11 parishes. St. Joseph's Cathedral in Lạng Sơn has been assigned as the Cathedral of the diocese. In June 2007, fifty deacons were officially ordained in Lạng Sơn.

References

Lang Son and Cao Bang
Christian organizations established in 1960
Roman Catholic dioceses and prelatures established in the 20th century
Lang Son and Cao Bang, Roman Catholic Diocese of
1960 establishments in North Vietnam